Alois Nebel is a 2011 Czech animated drama film directed by Tomáš Luňák, based on the comic-book trilogy by Jaroslav Rudiš and Jaromír 99. It is set in the late 1980s in a small village in the Jeseník Mountains, close to the Polish border, and tells the story of a train dispatcher who begins to suffer from hallucinations where the present converges with the dark past of the expulsion of Germans after World War II. The black-and-white film was animated mainly through rotoscoping and stars Miroslav Krobot as the title character. The film was selected as the Czech entry for the Best Foreign Language Film at the 84th Academy Awards, but it did not make the final shortlist. The film was submitted and won European Film Awards for Best Animated Film.

Cast
 Miroslav Krobot as Alois Nebel
 Marie Ludvíková as Květa
 Leoš Noha as Wachek
 Karel Roden as The Mute
 Alois Švehlík as Old Wachek
 Ondřej Malý as Olda
 Jan Sedal as Šokin
 Tereza Voříšková as Dorothe
 Marek Daniel as Psychiatrist
 Simona Babčáková as Berta
 Ivan Trojan as The Director of Czech Railways

Production
Based on Jaroslav Rudiš' and Jaromír 99's trilogy of comic books about the character Alois Nebel, White Brook, Main Station and Golden Hills, the film project was first presented at the 2009 International Film Festival Rotterdam's CineMart co-production market. Shortly after that it was picked up for international sales by The Match Factory. Production is led by the Czech company Negativ, and co-produced with Pallas Film in Germany and Tobogang in Slovakia. The film has a budget of 2.5 million euro. It is the feature-film debut of director Tomáš Luňák, who previously had made animated music videos and advertisements. Filming of Alois Nebel started in 2008.

Release
The film premiered out of competition at the 68th Venice International Film Festival on 4 September 2011. It was also screened at the 2011 Toronto International Film Festival. was scheduled to be released in the Czech Republic on 29 September 2011 through Aerofilms.

Critical response
Kirk Honeycutt of The Hollywood Reporter called the animation "a sheer wonder" and the film "a bracing experience for those who want animation to be more than 3D superheroics and anthropomorphic animal stories". He wrote that "Ultimately, the film may delve into too much specific Czech history and central European psychology to travel beyond those territories to other than film festivals", but "The glory of the film lies not in its story but rather in its atmosphere and imagery".

See also
 2011 in film
 Cinema of the Czech Republic
 Czech films of the 2010s
 List of animated feature films
List of black-and-white films produced since 1970
 List of submissions to the 84th Academy Awards for Best Foreign Language Film
 List of Czech submissions for the Academy Award for Best Foreign Language Film

References

External links
 Official website
 

2011 films
European Film Awards winners (films)
2010s Czech-language films
2011 animated films
2011 drama films
Animated drama films
Czech animated films
German animated films
German drama films
Czech black-and-white films
German black-and-white films
Animated films based on comics
Films set in the 1980s
Czech Lion Awards winners (films)
Anifilm award winners
2010s German animated films
Czech World War II films
German World War II films
2010s German films
Czech animated drama films
Czech adult animated films
Czech neo-noir films